Pamela Austin (born Pamela Joan Akert, December 20, 1941) is an American actress.

Early life
Austin was born in Omaha, Nebraska. She spent part of her childhood in Europe, as her father served a tour of duty with the Air Force there. Austin studied dancing at Sacramento State College, and found work with the Tony Martin nightclub act upon arriving in Hollywood.

Career
In addition to appearing in two Elvis Presley films, in 1964-1967 Austin gained fame for a long series of popular automobile television commercials (and print ads) for Dodge (the Charger, Coronet, Polara, and other models). As the perky "Dodge Rebellion Girl", she appeared in around twenty commercials as a damsel in distress — menaced by sharks, falling from a drawbridge, a roof, a cargo plane, etc. Her tag line at the end of each ad was "The Dodge Rebellion wants you!"

The ad series led to numerous film and television offers and a three-page profile in TV Guide (August 20–26, 1966). By 1968, Dodge executives felt Austin's popularity was overshadowing the cars and began a new "Dodge Fever" campaign with a different model, Joan Anita Parker.

In August 1967 she starred in the adventure-comedy film The Perils of Pauline based on the silent cliff-hanger serial. Posters for the film referenced her Dodge commercials: That "Rebellion Girl" is dodgin' unbelievable perils...

In 1968 she was a semi-regular on the hit comedy series Rowan & Martin's Laugh-In during its first season. Austin performed in various comedy sketches, song-and-dance numbers, and pre-filmed segments, including an early music video for "Buy For Me The Rain" by The Nitty Gritty Dirt Band.

Filmography

Films
Blue Hawaii (1961) - Selena (Sandy) Emerson
The Chapman Report (1962)
Rome Adventure (1962) - Agnes Hutton
Critic's Choice (1963) - Daughter (uncredited)
The Caretakers (1963) - Student Nurse (uncredited)
Hootenanny Hoot (1963) - Billie-Jo Henley
Kissin' Cousins (1964) - Selena Tatum
The Perils of Pauline (1967) - Pauline
Evil Roy Slade (1972, TV Movie) - Betsy Potter
Agatha (1979) - Pierrot #2
No Surrender (1985) - Organist
The Dressmaker (1988) - Singer (final film role)

Television
Screenplay: Nearly a Happy Ending (1980)
Columbo: Blueprint for Murder (1972)
Love American Style ("Love and the Phone Booth"; 1969)
Rowan & Martin's Laugh-In (six episodes; 1968)
It Takes a Thief ("Hans Across the Border", part 1 & 2) (1968)
The Virginian ("Girl on the Glass Mountain") (1966)
The Wild Wild West ("The Night of the Whirring Death"; 1966)
My Three Sons  ("Robbie and the Chorus Girl"; 1965)
The Twilight Zone ("Number 12 Looks Just Like You"; 1964)
The Fugitive ("Come Watch Me Die"; 1964)
Wagon Train ("Molly Kincaid Story"; 1963)
77 Sunset Strip ("Reunion at Balboa"; 1963) 
77 Sunset Strip ("The Steerer"; 1962) 
Surfside 6 ("Prescription for Panic"; 1961)
Lawman ("Jailbreak";1962)

Personal life
Austin married Charles W. Britt in Santa Clara, California on October 27, 1963; they had one child, a son, Beau C. Britt (born June 17, 1964). Austin and Britt divorced later that year.

She married, secondly, to Guy Franklin McElwaine (a Hollywood press agent) in Los Angeles on July 17, 1965. They divorced in June 1967. She married Leopold S. Wyler in Los Angeles on January 9, 1974.

References

External links

Fansite profile

1941 births
Living people
Actresses from Omaha, Nebraska
American television actresses
American film actresses
20th-century American actresses
21st-century American women